The Kodaganar River is a waterway in Tamil Nadu, India. It is a tributary of the Amaravati River.

References

Rivers of Tamil Nadu
Rivers of India